The New York Titans are a lacrosse team based in New York City playing in the National Lacrosse League (NLL). The 2008 season was the 2nd in franchise history.

The Titans improved on their 4-12 last place finish from 2007 by tying for the best record in the league, though tiebreakers meant that the Titans actually finished 3rd in the east. They beat the Minnesota Swarm in the team's first ever playoff game to advance to the division finals against the Buffalo Bandits. The Bandits' playoff experience proved too much for the young Titans, and the Bandits went on to the Championship game by defeating the Titans 19-12.

Regular season

Conference standings

Game log
Reference:

Playoffs

Game log
Reference:

Player stats
Reference:

Runners (Top 10)

Note: GP = Games played; G = Goals; A = Assists; Pts = Points; LB = Loose balls; PIM = Penalty minutes

Goaltenders
Note: GP = Games played; MIN = Minutes; W = Wins; L = Losses; GA = Goals against; Sv% = Save percentage; GAA = Goals against average

Awards

Roster
Reference:

See also
2008 NLL season

References

New York